Kaniža may refer to:

 Kaniža, the Croatian name for Nagykanizsa, Hungary
 Kaniža, Croatia, a village near Ivanec, Croatia

See also
 Kanizsa (disambiguation)
 Kanjiža, a town and municipality in Vojvodina, Serbia